The 1932 Minnesota lieutenant gubernatorial election took place on November 8, 1932. Minnesota Farmer–Labor Party candidate Konrad K. Solberg defeated Republican Party of Minnesota challenger Theodore G. Streissguth and Minnesota Democratic Party candidate Ruth Hayes Carpenter.

Results

Minnesota
Lieutenant Gubernatorial
1932